Putera Oesao or Putera Oesao Football Club is a Indonesian football team based in Oesao Football Field, Kupang Regency, East Nusa Tenggara. They currently competes in the Liga 3.

Players

Current squad

References

External links

Kupang Regency
Football clubs in Indonesia
Football clubs in East Nusa Tenggara